Jeffrey Scott Keppinger (born April 21, 1980) is an American retired Major League Baseball infielder. He played for the New York Mets, Kansas City Royals, Cincinnati Reds, Houston Astros, San Francisco Giants, Tampa Bay Rays, and Chicago White Sox.

Known as a contact hitter, Keppinger consistently had one of the lowest strikeout rates in the major leagues. He led the league in at-bats-to-strikeouts ratio in 2008 (19.1) and 2010 (14.3), and posted a career mark of 13.47 (214 strikeouts in 2,882 at-bats).

Amateur career
In 1994 Keppinger played on the Dunwoody Braves summer baseball team, and was named to the AAU All-American team. He also played for the New England Collegiate Baseball League's Keene Swamp Bats.

He compiled a .380 batting average at the University of Georgia where, in the  College World Series, he hit a two-run home run off star pitcher Mark Prior. In 2000 and 2001, he played collegiate summer baseball for the Orleans Cardinals of the Cape Cod Baseball League. He was selected by the Pittsburgh Pirates in the 4th round of the 2001 Major League Baseball draft.

Professional career

New York Mets
At the 2004 trading deadline, while Keppinger was in double-A ball, he was traded to the Mets as part of the Kris Benson for Ty Wigginton trade. His average soared even higher with the double-A Binghamton Mets and stayed above .300 with the triple-A Norfolk Tides earning him a call to the majors on August 20. He responded by hitting .284 with three home runs and nine RBI in 33 games played.

In 2005, Keppinger again excelled in Norfolk while hitting .337. He was poised to return to the majors in June when Kazuo Matsui was injured, but bad luck struck when Keppinger fractured his kneecap around the same time as Matsui. The injury not only prevented his return to the majors but ended his entire 2005 season.

Kansas City Royals
On July 19, 2006, Keppinger was acquired by the Kansas City Royals for middle infielder Ruben Gotay and Keppinger was sent to Triple-A Omaha.

Keppinger was called up by the Royals in August 2006. With a season-ending injury to starting third baseman Mark Teahen, Keppinger was expected to see some major league action. A key moment in his career occurred on September 9, 2006 at Boston's Fenway Park, when, after entering the game against the Red Sox as a pinch runner, he came to bat in the top of 12th inning in a 4-4 tie game with two runners on. Keppinger, batting against Manny Delcarmen, hit a ball just to the left of the right field foul pole for a three-run home run, breaking the 4-4 tie. The Royals went on to beat the Red Sox in that game 10-4.

Cincinnati Reds

On January 2, 2007, Keppinger was designated for assignment by the Royals. Eight days later, Keppinger was traded to the Cincinnati Reds. In return, the Royals received Minor League pitcher Russ Haltiwanger.

On May 13, 2008, Keppinger fractured his patella in the second inning of a game against the Florida Marlins, placing him on the 15-day disabled list. On June 22, 2008, he returned, much to the joy of the Reds who had just recently lost another shortstop to injury in Jolbert Cabrera. In 2008, he had the lowest strikeout percentage in the majors, at 4.8%, striking out once only every 19.1 at-bats.

Houston Astros
On March 31, 2009, Keppinger was traded to the Houston Astros for minor league infielder Drew Sutton. Keppinger saw a majority of his playing time at third base, filling in for Geoff Blum while he was injured. Still versatile, Keppinger also played shortstop, second base, and first base during the '08 and '09 seasons. Keppinger began the 2010 season with the Astros as the primary backup at second base to starter Kazuo Matsui. However, after Matsui's offense proved inept after 71 at-bats, Keppinger was named the starter after Matsui was released by the Astros on May 19, 2010.

San Francisco Giants
On July 19, 2011, Keppinger was traded to the San Francisco Giants for pitchers Henry Sosa and Jason Stoffel. He hit a walk-off single against his former team, the Houston Astros, on August 27 and 28, 2011.

Tampa Bay Rays
On January 26, 2012, Keppinger was signed to a 1-year deal with the Tampa Bay Rays. The deal became official the next day. Keppinger had a good season as a utility infielder, playing first, second and third base throughout the season. Over 115 games, Keppinger batted .325 in 385 at-bats. He also hit 9 home runs and 40 RBI with an OPS of .806. On May 19, Keppinger broke his big right toe while sitting in the dugout. A foul ball from Martin Prado struck Keppinger on the foot and he subsequently missed over a month. Keppinger became a free-agent at the end of the season.

Chicago White Sox

On December 10, 2012, Keppinger signed a 3-year, $12 million deal with the Chicago White Sox. He was designated for assignment on May 14, 2014. On May 21, the White Sox officially released Keppinger.

Personal life
Keppinger's older brother Billy, a left-handed pitcher, played independent baseball and minor league baseball in the Kansas City Royals system.

Keppinger resides in Dacula, Georgia. He married his second wife Dihanna on October 7, 2017 at The Ritz Carlton in Lake Oconee, Georgia.

References

External links

Minor League Splits and Situational Stats

1980 births
Living people
Major League Baseball second basemen
New York Mets players
Kansas City Royals players
Cincinnati Reds players
Houston Astros players
San Francisco Giants players
Tampa Bay Rays players
Chicago White Sox players
Georgia Bulldogs baseball players
Orleans Firebirds players
Hickory Crawdads players
Lynchburg Hillcats players
Altoona Curve players
Binghamton Mets players
Norfolk Tides players
Omaha Royals players
Sarasota Reds players
Louisville Bats players
Corpus Christi Hooks players
Oklahoma City RedHawks players
Durham Bulls players
Birmingham Barons players
Baseball players from Miami